Yadvinder Goma (born 4 February 1986, Palampur, Himachal Pradesh, India) is a Member of Legislative Assembly from Jaisinghpur, Himachal Pradesh, India. In 2022, he won from Ravi Dhiman with a margin of 2,696 votes in Legislative Assembly elections. He has B.Tech. degree in mechanical engineering from Himachal Pradesh University and MBA degree. He got married in 2015.
 
He was elected to Himachal Pradesh Vidhan Sabha from 2012 to 2017.

References

People from Kangra district
1986 births
Living people
Himachal Pradesh MLAs 2012–2017
People from Kangra, Himachal Pradesh
Indian National Congress politicians